Eleanora Armitage (December 11, 1865 - October 24, 1961) was a British bryologist who was a founding member of the Moss Exchange Club, the British Ecological Society and the British Bryological Society and served as president of the later organisation in 1939. She was an accomplished collector and her herbarium is now held at Bristol Museum. She was also a member of the British Association for the Advancement of Science as well as the Royal Horticultural Society.

Early life 
Armitage was born on 11 December 1865 at Dadnor House in Bridstow to Isabel Jane Armitage (née Perceval) and her husband Arthur. Armitage was educated at home. Her father was a member of the Woolhope Naturalists’ Field Club and her mother painted watercolours, some of which are held in the club's library. Despite her father having served as president of the Woolhope Club, Armitage was unable to join, as club banned the admission of women.

Botanising 
In 1896 Armitage became a founding member of the Moss Exchange Club. The Moss Exchange Club would later become the British Bryological Society. Armitage was also a member of the Botanical Essay Society. Armitage botanised frequently in Herefordshire and would sometimes be accompanied by Charles Herbert Binstead. She travelled frequently, including to Madeira, Grand Canary, Tenerife, Spain, Azores, Norway and Switzerland, and often collected specimens on her trips. She was also a botanical artist and Kew holds a collection of her paintings.

Death 
She died on the 24 October 1961 after a fall.

Bibliography

References 

1865 births
1961 deaths
British women botanists
British botanists
Bryologists
Women bryologists